Emad Jassim (born 17 August 1960) is an Iraqi former footballer. He competed in the men's tournament at the 1984 Summer Olympics.

Career statistics

International goals
Scores and results list Iraq's goal tally first.

References

External links
 
 
 

1960 births
Living people
Iraqi footballers
Iraq international footballers
Olympic footballers of Iraq
Footballers at the 1984 Summer Olympics
Place of birth missing (living people)
Association football forwards
Asian Games medalists in football
Asian Games gold medalists for Iraq
Footballers at the 1982 Asian Games
Medalists at the 1982 Asian Games
Al-Quwa Al-Jawiya players